Flávio Nunes Ferreira (born 19 October 1991) is a Portuguese retired professional footballer who played as a central defender or a defensive midfielder.

Club career
Ferreira was born in Nogueira do Cravo, Oliveira do Hospital. After starting his youth career with hometown's F.C. Oliveira do Hospital, he finished his formation with Académica de Coimbra.

In August 2009, Ferreira moved to neighbouring G.D. Tourizense – who acted as Académica's farm team – until the end of the season. A year later he signed for second division club S.C. Covilhã, also on loan, and played his first match as a professional on 26 September 2010, coming on as a second-half substitute in a 1–0 home win against S.C. Freamunde.

In June 2011, Ferreira returned to Académica, and made his Primeira Liga debut on 15 August in a 2–1 away success over U.D. Leiria where he again came from the bench. On 23 December 2011 he renewed his contract with the Students, running until 2015.

On 12 June 2013, Académica agreed a deal for Ferreira with La Liga side Málaga CF, with the player signing a three-year contract. On 12 January of the following year he first appeared in the Spanish league, replacing the injured Weligton in the 34th minute of a 0–1 loss at Levante UD.

Subsequently, Ferreira went on to spend nearly two years on the sidelines due to back problems.

Personal life
Ferreira's older brother, António, was also a footballer. He also represented Tourizense and was brought up at Sporting Clube de Portugal, but spent most of his career in the lower leagues.

Honours
Académica
Taça de Portugal: 2011–12

References

External links

1991 births
Living people
Portuguese footballers
Association football defenders
Association football midfielders
Association football utility players
Primeira Liga players
Liga Portugal 2 players
Segunda Divisão players
F.C. Oliveira do Hospital players
Associação Académica de Coimbra – O.A.F. players
G.D. Tourizense players
S.C. Covilhã players
La Liga players
Málaga CF players
Portugal youth international footballers
Portuguese expatriate footballers
Expatriate footballers in Spain
Portuguese expatriate sportspeople in Spain
People from Oliveira do Hospital
Sportspeople from Coimbra District